Owen Moxon (born 17 January 1998) is an English footballer who plays as a midfielder for Carlisle United. Moxon has previously played for Queen of the South, as well as Gretna 2008 on loan.

Career
Born in Carlisle, Cumbria, Moxon began his career at Queen of the South. Moxon was first included in a senior match-day squad on 1 August 2015, remaining an unused substitute for their 4–3 extra-time win over Annan Athletic in the first round of the Scottish League Cup. In the next round, on 25 August 2015, Moxon made his debut, replacing Kyle Hutton for the final 14 minutes of a 1–0 defeat to Greenock Morton at Palmerston Park. Moxon played his first league game on 5 September 2015, appearing for the final 7 minutes, replacing Mark Millar as Queens lost 2–0 at Palmerston versus St Mirren in the Scottish Championship.

On 30 January 2017, Moxon moved on loan to Lowland League club Gretna 2008, for the remainder of the season.

Moxon's contract was not renewed during May 2017, so after two seasons he was released by the club.

On 22 June 2017, Moxon signed for Scottish League Two club Annan Athletic.

Career statistics

References

External links

1998 births
Living people
Footballers from Carlisle, Cumbria
English footballers
Association football midfielders
Queen of the South F.C. players
Gretna F.C. 2008 players
Annan Athletic F.C. players
Carlisle United F.C. players
Scottish Professional Football League players
Lowland Football League players